Phyllophaga hornii is a species of May beetle or junebug in the family Scarabaeidae. It is found in North America.

References

Further reading

 
 
 
 
 
 

Melolonthinae